The Douglas Entrance (also known as La Puerta del Sol) is a historic site in Coral Gables, Florida. It is located at the junction of Douglas Road and Tamiami Trail (US 41). The architect was Phineas Paist and it was completed in 1924. On September 22, 1972, it is listed on the U.S. National Register of Historic Places.

The Douglas Entrance design also involved Denman Fink and Walter De Garmo.

References
Notes

Bibliography

 Behar, Roberto M., ed. Coral Gables. Paris, France: Editions Norma, 1997. 
 Patricios, Nicholas N. Building Marvelous Miami. Gainesville, FL: University Press of Florida, 1994. .

External links

 Dade County listings at National Register of Historic Places
 Florida's Office of Cultural and Historical Programs
 Dade County listings
 Douglas Entrance

National Register of Historic Places in Miami-Dade County, Florida
Buildings and structures in Coral Gables, Florida
1924 establishments in Florida